The Embassy of Switzerland in London is the diplomatic mission of Switzerland in the United Kingdom. It consists of a large nineteenth-century building with a modern addition and is located halfway between Montagu Square and Bryanston Square. There is a commemorative stone at the entrance to the embassy marking its rebuilding in 1970.

Gallery

See also 

 Foreign relations of Switzerland
 List of diplomatic missions of Switzerland

References

External links
Official site

Switzerland
London
Switzerland–United Kingdom relations
Buildings and structures in the City of Westminster
Marylebone